Leucochimona icare, also known as the Amazonian whitemark, is a species of butterfly in the family Riodinidae. It is found in French Guiana, Guyana, Suriname, Colombia, Bolivia and Brazil.

Subspecies
Leucochimona icare icare (Surinam, Guyana)
Leucochimona icare matatha (Hewitson, 1873) (Brazil: Minas Gerais)
Leucochimona icare nivea (Godman & Salvin, 1885) (Bolivia)
Leucochimona icare polita Stichel, 1910 (Colombia)
Leucochimona icare subalbata (Seitz, 1913) (Bolivia)

References

Riodinidae
Butterflies described in 1819
Taxa named by Jacob Hübner
Riodinidae of South America